Dar Mazar (also Romanized as Dar Mazār and Dar-e Mazār,; also known as Darb-e Mazār, Darb-e Mazār-e Sheīkh Bakhtīār, Darbmazār, Darb Mazār-e Sheykh Bakhtīār, Darb Mazar Sheikh Bakhtiyār, and Darīmzār) is a village in Dalfard Rural District, Sarduiyeh District, Jiroft County, Kerman Province, Iran. At the 2006 census, its population was 95, in 30 families.

References 

Populated places in Jiroft County